Analyte-specific reagents (ASRs) are a class of  biological molecules which can be used to identify and measure the amount of an individual chemical substance in biological specimens.

Regulatory definition

The U.S. Food and Drug Administration (FDA) defines analyte specific reagents (ASRs) in 21 CFR 864.4020 as “antibodies, both polyclonal and monoclonal, specific receptor proteins, ligands, nucleic acid sequences, and similar reagents which, through specific binding or chemical reaction with substances in a specimen, are intended to use in a diagnostic application for identification and quantification of an individual chemical substance or ligand in biological specimens.” 

In simple terms an analyte specific reagent is the active ingredient of an in-house test.

External links
Guidance for Industry and FDA Staff - Commercially Distributed Analyte Specific Reagents (ASRs): Frequently Asked Questions
Code of Federal Regulations - Specimen Preparation Reagents (21CFR864.4020)

Chemical tests
Biomolecules